Jacques Antonio Passy Kahn (born 30 September 1975) is a Mexican professional football manager who was the head coach of the Dominican Republic senior and under-23 national teams.

Managerial career
Passy holds coaching badges from the Mexican Football Federation and the Peruvian Football Federation in addition to taking specialized courses at the Dutch KNVB.
In 2006, Passy was technical director and coach of Dorados de Sinaloa as they reached Liga MX where he was the youngest coach in the top flight.  He has also been coach of the Mexico team at European and Pan-American Maccabiah Games since 2004. As of 2015, he accumulated 14 victories over 4 tournaments and almost reached the final. He was called "The most decorated coach in the Maccabiah" by a columnist for the Jerusalem Post.  Other positions he has held include coach of Deportivo Israelita and president of Mexico's University of Johan Cruyff where he has trained over 400 managers. In this position, he worked closely with Latin American teams for consulting and training. He has established close ties with many clubs including Chivas de Guadalajara, Club América, and Maccabi Tel Aviv.  In 2014, it was announced that Passy was in talks to sign a 4-year contract to be manager of the Suriname national team.

Saint Kitts and Nevis
Passy was named national team manager of Saint Kitts and Nevis in 2015 after impressing FA officials during a conference at which he spoke. His first matches as the manager were against El Salvador during 2018 FIFA World Cup qualification. He also worked as technical director.

In November 2015, the team traveled to Europe for matches against Andorra and Estonia, the nation's first matches in history against European opponents. Devaughn Elliott scored the only goal in the 1–0 victory over Andorra for Saint Kitts and Nevis's first European victory. The result was also the first away victory for a CFU team over a European side on their home soil.  During his Tenure, Passy took the team to a record high 73 in the FIFA ranking, 86 spots higher than when he took over the team.

In 2018, he was named as a finalist for the CONCACAF Coach of the Year.

Dominican Republic
In August 2020, Passy was appointed coach of the Dominican Republic under-23 national team, to direct it in the 2020 CONCACAF Men's Olympic Qualifying Championship. Shortly thereafter he was also named manager of the senior national team.

Managerial statistics

References

1975 births
Living people
Mexican people of French descent
Mexican people of German descent
Mexican Jews
Mexican football managers
Sportspeople from Mexico City
Dorados de Sinaloa managers
Saint Kitts and Nevis national football team managers
Dominican Republic national football team managers
Suriname national football team managers
Mexican expatriate football managers
Expatriate football managers in Saint Kitts and Nevis
Expatriate football managers in the Dominican Republic
Expatriate football managers in Suriname
Mexican expatriate sportspeople in Saint Kitts and Nevis
Mexican expatriate sportspeople in Suriname
Mexican expatriate sportspeople in the Dominican Republic